Plankeye was an American Christian alternative rock band and one of Tooth & Nail Records' greatest successes during the 1990s and early 2000s.  Plankeye's style could be defined as melodic post-grunge combined with indie and alternative elements. Their first few albums also incorporated a fair amount of punk rock elements, but this aspect faded when original singer Scott Silletta left the band.

History

In 1994, Plankeye released Spill, their first album, which was able to garner enough sales to catch the interest of Tooth and Nail Records.  Spill was re-released on Tooth and Nail, as Plankeye went into the studio again to record a slightly less aggressive album, The Spark.  In 1996, Plankeye released Commonwealth, which introduced a more polished and mature sound.  Over the course of the next year, the group toured constantly, opening for the Newsboys. In November 1997, the group released their best selling album, The One & Only.  To promote this album, Plankeye headlined "The One & Only Tour", featuring opening act, the Insyderz.  One year later, lead singer Scott Silletta and drummer Adam Ferry left Plankeye. Adam Ferry left to become a youth pastor and Scott Silletta left to form the short-lived pop-punk band Fanmail. Silletta later formed a record label called "Vanishing Point Records" with a lineup including his new band "The Franchise".  He also created his own recording studio called Orange Crush Studio located in Orange, California.  

In 1999, Balmer and Garcia released Relocation on a new record label, BEC Recordings.  This album featured Plankeye's heartfelt single, "Goodbye".  Some wondered if this song was subtly referencing Scott and Adam's departure from the band, something which Eric and Luis refuted.  

In 2001, Plankeye's song, "When It Comes", was chosen by MP3.com to be included on their radio show 'The Download'.  Plankeye beat out 12,000 or so other Alternative bands on MP3.com to get on the show. 

In spring of 2001, Kevin Poush and Louie Ruiz joined Plankeye to record Plankeye's most experimental album to date, Strange Exchange.  In 2002, Poush and Ruiz left the band, and Balmer and Garcia recorded Wings to Fly, a best-of compilation which also had 6 new songs including a re-recording of "Bicycle", from Commonwealth.

After Plankeye broke up, Eric Balmer formed a band called Fielding with his wife, Beth. They have released 4 albums: A self-titled album in 2005, The Voice of Us on April 14, 2009, Our Side Is An Ocean on July 9, 2013, and most recently, Rags of Light on March 29, 2019.

Members 

 Eric Balmer – vocals, guitar (1992–2002)
 Luis Garcia – bass guitar, keys, vocals (1992–2002)
 Scott Silletta – vocals, guitar (1992–1998)
 Adam Ferry – drums (1992–1998)
 Shane Valdez – drums (1998, live only)
 Jeremiah Shackelford – guitar (1999, live only)
 Kevin Poush – guitar (2001)
 Louie Ruiz – drums (2001)

Discography
 Spill, 1994 (Walk the Plank)
 Spill, 1994 [Tooth & Nail]
 The Spark, 1995 [Tooth & Nail]
 Commonwealth, 1996 [Tooth & Nail]
 The One and Only, 1997 [Tooth & Nail]
 Relocation, 1999 [BEC] (Review: HM Magazine)
 Strange Exchange, 2001 [BEC]
 Wings to Fly, 2002 [BEC]

Compilations
 Seltzer, 1996
 Never Say Dinosaur, 1996
 Tooth & Nail Rock Sampler, 1997
 Tooth & Nail Box Set, 1997
 Happy Christmas: A BEC Holiday Collection, 1998
 Seltzer 2, 1998
 BEC Recordings Sampler Volume One, 1998
 Propska One, 1998
 Happy Christmas Vol. 2, 1999
 Moms Like Us Too Vol. 1, 1999
 Tooth & Nail Rock Sampler Vol. 2, 1999
 Cheapskates Sampler: Softer Side, 1999
 Sleighed: The Other Side of Christmas, 2000
 Cheapskates Vol. 2, 2001
 Simply Survival: New Music Sampler,  2001
 Tooth & Nail 10th Anniversary Box Set,  2003
 Cheapskates Vol. 4, 2003
 Classics (Rock), 2004
 Surfonic Water Revival

References

External links
 
 [ Entry on AllMusic.com]
 Fielding Website

Alternative rock groups from California
Christian rock groups from California
Musical groups from Orange County, California
Musical groups established in 1992